Country music has a long history in Canada. The genre evolved out of the diverse musical practices of the Appalachian region of the United States. Appalachian folk music was largely Scottish and Irish, with an important influence also being the African American country blues. Parts of Ontario, British Columbia and the Maritime provinces shared a tradition with the Appalachian region, and country music became popular quite quickly in these places.  Fiddlers like George Wade and Don Messer helped to popularize the style, beginning in the late 1920s. Wade was not signed until the 1930s, when Victor Records, inspired by the success of Wilf Carter the year before, signed him, Hank Snow and Hank LaRivière.

Canadian country as developed by Otto Wilke, Carter, Snow, Earl Heywood, and Stu Davis used a less nasal and more distinctly pronounced vocal style than American music, and stuck with more traditional ballads and narratives while US country began to use more songs about bars, family relationships, and quarrels between lovers. This style of country music became very popular in Canada over the next couple of decades.  Later popular Canadian country stars range from Stompin' Tom Connors and Tom Jackson to Shania Twain and Rick Tippe to Dean Brody, Brett Kissel, Paul Brandt and Jess Moskaluke.

Radio and television stations in Canada which play country music, however, are sometimes more flexible in how they define the genre than their counterparts in the United States. Canadian country stations have commonly played artists more commonly associated with folk music, such as Bruce Cockburn, Leahy, Spirit of the West and The Rankin Family.

There is also a small francophone scene in the genre, typically sung in the joual dialect. Francophone artists include Renée Martel, Gildor Roy, Patrick Norman, Willie Lamothe, Steph Carse and Georges Hamel.

For local musicians in Alberta, the Calgary Stampede provides the majority of their annual income. The Coca-Cola stage provides a mix of Canadian and cross-Alberta performers while the Nashville North tent provides a stage for numerous commercial country acts.  The Western Oasis schedules traditional folk and country acts for their Window on the West series, but most Calgary country, folk and roots musicians will be found performing throughout the city during the Stampede, often playing upwards of four gigs per day.

See also
The Flemings of Torbay

References

 
Canadian styles of music